"Hey Boy Hey Girl" is a song by the British big beat duo the Chemical Brothers. The song contains a sample from "The Roof Is on Fire" by Rock Master Scott & the Dynamic Three. "Hey Boy Hey Girl" was released as the first single from the Chemical Brothers' third studio album, Surrender (1999), on 31 May 1999.

Upon its release, the song peaked at number three on the UK Singles Chart in June 1999 and remained on the chart for 10 weeks. It also reached the top 10 in Finland, Iceland, Ireland, New Zealand, Norway and Spain, as well on Canada's RPM Dance Chart. In the latter country, it did not make it onto the RPM Top Singles chart, but it did debut and peak at number three on the Canadian Singles Chart.

Critical reception
Daily Record commented, "Ed Simons and Tom Rowlands are back with another fantastic dance single. It's another block rockin' hit." In October 2011, NME placed it at number 50 on its list "150 Best Tracks of the Past 15 Years", writing that the song "[starts] with a menacing, trance laden groove" and "[builds] to an absolute dance stomper".

Music video
The music video (directed by Dom and Nic) opens with a group of schoolchildren on board a coach. The camera focuses on a young girl who opens a medical book of pictures of the human skeleton. A blond boy spits on the page, then smiles at her as he walks away. The children go to the Natural History Museum, where the same boy tries to scare the girl with a skull in his hood. She chases the boy in the museum, but falls near the bottom of a flight of stairs and fractures her wrist. At the hospital, she gets an X-ray of her hand. It then shows her brushing her teeth whilst picturing herself as only bones. The background behind her morphs into a toilet area at the Ministry of Sound nightclub, South London. When she reverts into a person, she is older (played by Hanne Klintoe). She passes a couple having sex in a stall, but she only sees them as skeletons (this shot was omitted from some pre-watershed television edits of the video). She exits the bathroom and heads to the nightclub's bar, where a man (uncredited appearance of Rick Warden) tries to talk with her. She then pictures him as a skeleton and feels his jawbone before leaving. She then goes to the dance floor, and sees more people as skeletons, almost as if she has X-ray vision. She exits the nightclub, and the Chemical Brothers themselves make a brief cameo appearance, stepping out of a taxi with DJ equipment. She then steps into that same taxi, where she sees the driver as a skeleton. He then asks her 'Where you going, baby?' in a camp, droll voice.

Track listings
Standard CD and cassette single
 "Hey Boy Hey Girl" – 4:48
 "Flashback" – 5:18
 "Scale" – 3:43

Standard 12-inch single
 "Hey Boy Hey Girl" (extended version) – 6:01
 "Flashback" – 5:18
 "Scale" – 3:43

European CD single
 "Hey Boy Hey Girl" (radio edit) – 3:32
 "Flashback" – 5:18

Credits and personnel
Credits are lifted from the Surrender album booklet.

Studios
 Recorded at Orinoco Studios (South London, England)
 Edited at Berwick Street Studios (London, England)
 Mastered at The Exchange (London, England)

Personnel

 The Chemical Brothers – production
 Tom Rowlands – writing
 Ed Simons – writing
 Gregory Carlton Wigfall – writing
 Richard Lee Fowler – writing
 Charles Pettiford – writing
 Celite Evans – writing
 Jerry Bloodrock – writing
 Steve Dub – engineering
 Cheeky Paul – editing
 Mike Marsh – mastering

Charts and certifications

Weekly charts

Year-end charts

Certifications

Release history

Cover versions
In 2018 Belgian Producer duo Dimitri Vegas & Like Mike released a remake of the song titled Here We Go (Hey Boy, Hey Girl) together with Dutch producer Nicky Romero on their Tomorrowland 2018 EP

In 2020 French producer David Guetta (under his Jack Back alias) released a remake of the song titled Superstar DJ.

References

1999 singles
1999 songs
The Chemical Brothers songs
Astralwerks singles
Song recordings produced by David Guetta
Songs written by Ed Simons
Songs written by Tom Rowlands